ACUCA stands for Association of Christian Universities and Colleges in Asia.

See also 
 Acuka